Villa Niscemi is a villa in Palermo. It is located in the north-western part of the city, near La Favorita Park.

History
The villa has been the main residence of the noble Valguarnera family for about three centuries. The origins of the building date back to the 16th century, but the villa has taken the current aspect during the late 18th century. In fact, at that time, the Valguarnera family reconfigured the existing structure, by giving it a more Baroque physiognomy and enriching it of paintings, frescoes and other artworks.

The famous jeweller Fulco di Verdura, son of Carolina Valguarnera, spent his childhood in this villa.

In 1987 the Valguarnera family sold the villa to the Comune of Palermo and, thus, the villa has been chosen as one of the representing headquarters of the Mayor.

In popular culture
The villa appeared on the seventh episode of The Amazing Race 25 as the pit stop.

References

External links 
 Villa Niscemi - culturaitalia.it
 Villa Niscemi - palermoweb.com

Niscemi
Baroque architecture in Palermo
Renaissance architecture in Palermo